DailyMed is a website operated by the U.S. National Library of Medicine (NLM) to publish up-to-date and accurate drug labels (also called a "package insert") to health care providers and the general public. The contents of DailyMed is provided and updated daily by the U.S. Food and Drug Administration (FDA). The FDA in turn collects this information from the pharmaceutical industry.

The documents published use the HL7 version 3 Structured Product Labeling (SPL) standard, which is an XML format that combines the human readable text of the product label with structured data elements that describe the composition, form, packaging, and other properties of the drug products in detail according to the HL7 Reference Information Model (RIM).

, it contained information about 140,232 drug listings.

It includes an RSS feed for updated drug information.

History
In 2006 the FDA revised the drug label and also created DailyMed to keep prescription information up to date.

See also 

 Consumer Product Information Database, ingredients of household products
 Environmental Working Group, which maintains a database of cosmetics ingredients

References

External links
 
 labels.fda.gov Drug labels at FDA website

American medical websites
United States National Library of Medicine
Medical search engines
Medical databases
Online databases
Health informatics